The 2nd constituency of Bács-Kiskun County is one of the single member constituencies of the National Assembly, the national legislature of Hungary. The constituency standard abbreviation: Bács-Kiskun 02. OEVK.

Since 2022, it has been represented by Gyula Szeberényi of the Fidesz–KDNP party alliance.

Geography
The 2nd constituency is located in north-eastern part of Bács-Kiskun County.

List of municipalities
The constituency includes the following municipalities:

Members
The constituency was first represented by Gábor Zombor of the Fidesz from 2014 to 2022. He was succeeded by Gyula Szeberényi of the Fidesz in 2022.

References

Bács-Kiskun 2nd